Massimiliano Romeo (born 22 January 1971) is an Italian politician. He is the group leader of Lega Nord in the Italian Senate.

References 

1971 births
Living people
Members of the Regional Council of Lombardy
Senators of Legislature XVIII of Italy
Lega Nord politicians
21st-century Italian politicians
People from Monza